Luca Campogrande (born 30 April 1996) is an Italian basketball player for Pallacanestro Trieste of the Italian Lega Basket Serie A (LBA). He is a 6 ft 6 in (1.98 m) shooting guard.

Professional career
Luca Campogrande grew up in the youth sector of Sam Basket Roma, where he achieved the title of Italian U-19 Elite champion in 2015. The following year he went to Fortitudo Bologna, for the first time he played in Serie A2 League, where he signed a two-year deal.

On 11 July 2017 he went to Ponderosa Montegranaro.

On 6 July 2018 Campogrande signed a deal with LBA club Sidigas Avellino.

On 27 July 2019 he signed with New Basket Brindisi of the Italian Lega Basket Serie A (LBA).

On 6 August 2020 he was the first who signed for Virtus Roma for the 2020–21 season.

After Virtus Roma's withdrawal from the Serie A due to financial problems, Campogrande, like all the Roma players, was made free agent. After that he first joined Reyer Venezia for trainings and soon after, on 18 December, he was signed until the end of the season.

On 26 June 2021 Campogrande signed a 1+1 contract with Pallacanestro Trieste.

Honours
Fortitudo Bologna
LNP Supercup (1): 2016

References

External links
Lega Basket Serie A profile  Retrieved 12 June 2019
Serie A2 profile  Retrieved 12 June 2019

1996 births
Living people
Basketball players from Rome
Fortitudo Pallacanestro Bologna players
Italian men's basketball players
Lega Basket Serie A players
New Basket Brindisi players
Pallacanestro Trieste players
S.S. Felice Scandone players
Shooting guards